The Von Bach Dam (originally the Sartorius von Bach Dam) is a rock-fill embankment dam on the Swakop River near Okahandja in the Otjozondjupa Region of Namibia. Built in 1968 and commissioned in 1970, the dam provides Namibia's capital of Windhoek with much of the city's water. It also supplies Okahandja. Water from the reservoir is sent directly to a water treatment plant downstream. The treatment plant was completed in 1971 and upgraded in 1997.

References

Okahandja
Dams in Namibia
Buildings and structures in Otjozondjupa Region
Dams completed in 1970
1970 establishments in South West Africa